The Epistle of the Apostles is a work of New Testament apocrypha.  Despite its name, it is more a gospel or an apocalypse than an epistle.  The work takes the form of an open letter purportedly from the remaining eleven apostles describing key events of the life of Jesus, followed by a dialogue between the resurrected Jesus and the apostles where Jesus reveals apocalyptic secrets of reality and the future. It is 51 chapters long.  The epistle was likely written in the 2nd century CE in Koine Greek, but was lost for many centuries.  A partial Coptic language manuscript was discovered in 1895, a more complete Ethiopic language manuscript was published in 1913, and a full Coptic-Ethiopic-German edition was published in 1919.

The work's intent is to uphold early orthodox Christian doctrine, refuting Gnosticism and docetism.  The teachings of the Gnostics Cerinthus and Simon Magus are denounced as false.  In the debate on the nature of Jesus's existence of the 2nd century, the Epistle of the Apostles firmly advocates that the incarnation of Jesus was of flesh and blood, and that the future resurrection in the Kingdom of God would also be a fleshly experience.  The work is presented as having been written shortly after the Resurrection of Jesus, and offers predictions of the coming of Paul of Tarsus, the fall of Jerusalem, and of the Second Coming happening imminently in the 2nd century CE.

History 
The text is commonly dated to the 2nd century, perhaps towards the first half of it. Charles E. Hill dates the Epistle to "just before 120, or in the 140s".  Francis Watson dates it to around 170, after the Antonine plague, due to the references to death and disease as a sign of the end times.  Most scholars favor an origin of Roman Egypt; other possibilities include Asia Minor and Roman Syria.

The work was seemingly not widely distributed; no surviving ancient Christian writings seem to refer to it, suggesting its circulation was limited.  The work was lost to most of the world; copies were still produced and maintained in certain Ethiopian monasteries as late as the 16th century, but it was a minor and obscure work there, and completely unknown elsewhere.  In 1895, major portions of it were discovered in the Coptic language from a 4th–5th century manuscript by Carl Schmidt, a German Coptologist.  In 1910, the English scholar M. R. James spotted similarities between the initial Coptic translations provided by Schmidt and various translations of unclassified Ethiopic documents; he realized that the Ethiopic manuscripts were likely from the same work as the Coptic manuscript.  This Ethiopic language version also was more complete, including sections that were too damaged to read in the Coptic manuscripts.  A French-Ethiopic edition was published in 1913, and a combined German-Coptic-Ethiopic work published by Schmidt in 1919. The fragmentary Coptic manuscript is believed to be translated directly from the original Greek; the Ethiopic may also have been directly translated, although less certainty exists.  M. R. James also identified that one leaf of a Latin palimpsest, dating to the 5th century, was derived from the same text.

The original title of the work, if any, is unknown. Schmidt used the Latin  to name the text (with an 'o' rather than a 'u'), despite the work not having a strong affinity for Latin; that title has proven more popular in later works, and it is frequently translated into whatever language the author is using (Epistle of the Apostles, etc.).

Content 
The text is initially framed as an open letter from the 11 apostles after Jesus's resurrection but before his ascension, but it rapidly sheds this structure, and the work as a whole cannot be accurately described as an epistle.  Rather, the work becomes a gospel that describes the life and miracles of Jesus, then becomes an apocalypse where the risen Christ tells of revelations of hidden truths in response to questions from the disciples. The first 10 chapters begin by describing the nativity, resurrection, and miracles of Jesus. The remainder of the text recounts a vision and dialog between Jesus and the apostles, consisting of about sixty questions, and 41 short chapters.

The text itself appears to be based on parts of the New Testament, in particular the Gospel of John, as well as the Apocalypse of Peter, Epistle of Barnabas, and Shepherd of Hermas, all of which were considered inspired by various groups or individuals during periods of the early church.

Countering Gnosticism 
The whole text seems to have been intended as a refutation of the teachings of Cerinthus, although "Simon" (probably Simon Magus) is also mentioned. The content heavily criticizes Gnosticism. In particular the text uses the style of a discourse and series of questions with a vision of Jesus that was popular among Gnostic groups, wherein the apparition of Jesus would reveal new secret teachings propounded by the Gnostics.  Examples of this genre (sometimes called a "Dialogue Gospel") within Gnosticism include the Gospel of Mary, the Apocryphon of John, the Sophia of Jesus Christ, and the Pistis Sophia.  However, the Epistle of the Apostles repurposes this genre to use against Gnosticism, where the resurrected Jesus affirms early orthodox Christian belief on the nature of his flesh and the coming resurrection.  The text also affirms that it is not a secret teaching (it is "written (...) for the whole world") and its content applies universally rather than to one group and that everyone can easily come to learn its content, contradicting the esoteric mysteries popular in Gnosticism.

The Parable of the Ten Virgins is repurposed to more directly address Gnosticism in the Epistle of the Apostles.  The apostles ask which of the virgins were wise and which were foolish; Jesus replies by saying that "The five wise are Faith and Love and Grace, Peace, and Hope" while the virgins who are shut out of the wedding are named "Knowledge (Gnosis) and Wisdom (Sophia), Obedience, Forbearance, and Mercy." (Coptic version)  Jesus then goes on to predict that the false Christians who fell asleep "will remain outside the kingdom and the fold of the shepherd and his sheep" and will be devoured by wolves.  In other words, Gnostics will not be granted entrance into the Kingdom of God.

Carl Schmidt, the scholar who rediscovered the work, believed that the work was more intended to shore up the faith of non-Gnostics against conversion to Gnosticism than attack Gnosticism directly.  Later scholars have generally not agreed with such a distinction, as the method which the work confirms early catholic views was precisely by refuting Gnosticism.  A dissenting view is offered by Francis Watson, who argues that the work does not have an anti-heretical or anti-Gnostic agenda.

On the flesh 
The Epistle of the Apostles includes polemics emphasizing the physical nature of the resurrection.  This is presumably to counter docetism, the doctrine that Jesus had been a purely divine being separate from the corrupt mortal world common among Gnosticism, seen in works such as the Book of Thomas the Contender.  The work does use a Gnostic-style construction of Jesus's descent through the heavens to Earth, but quickly affirms that he "became flesh" (Chapters 13–14).  The resurrected Jesus has the apostles place their fingers in the print of the nails, in the spear wound in his side, and checking for footprints; this is to "prove" that the future resurrection will be a fleshly and physical one.  The story of the footprints is also in direct contradiction to a story in the docetic Acts of John where the disciples realize that Jesus does not leave any footprints.

Predictions 
The Epistle of the Apostles makes a number of statements of prophecy, albeit some appear to be vaticinium ex eventu ("predictions" of events that already occurred).  Notably, the conversion of Paul the Apostle is predicted in Chapter 31.  The work also seemingly sets a date for the Second Coming of Jesus; chapter 17 says it will come "when the hundredth part and the twentieth part is completed" (Coptic) or "when the hundred and fiftieth year is completed" (Ethiopic), implying the Ethiopic manuscript might have been written after 120 years had already passed.  It is not entirely clear when Jesus is counting from (his death?  his ascension?), but shows that the audience in the second century still expected a speedy apocalypse and the advent of the Kingdom of God within the next few decades.

The work also "predicts" the rise of Gnosticism in a hostile manner: Jesus declares that false teachers will attempt to subvert his message in the future.

Prayers for the dead 
One passage in the Epistle of the Apostles appears to depend on the original form of the Apocalypse of Peter, suggesting that it may have been composed afterward.  The Apostles tell Jesus that they are concerned on account of the damned; Jesus compliments them as the righteous too are anxious about sinners, and Jesus promises to hear requests concerning them. This particular theological idea, of the righteous being able to pray sinners into heaven, was later condemned during the Origenist Controversies, but seems to have been common in 2nd century Christianity.

Errors 
In the gospel portion recounting Jesus's life, it is said that he suffered during the days of Pontius Pilate and Herod Archelaus.  Archelaus was removed as ethnarch (governor, client-king) in 6 CE, however, and was dead by 18 CE - far earlier than Pilate's term as procurator.  The work likely confused him with Herod Antipas.

While not exactly an error, the epistle identifies "Peter" and "Cephas" as two different apostles.  While some early traditions did hold that they were separate people, most later Christians were of the opinion that they were two names for the same person, as many Jews of the era had dual names (Cephas being his Aramaic name, Peter his Greek name).

Galilean discourse
In the Ethiopic manuscripts discovered, many of them are codices which start with an Ethipioc version of the Testamentum Domini, and then feature a bridge section, likely originally composed in Ethiopic, that connects the Testamentum Domini with the Epistle of the Apostles. Similar to the main work, it features a resurrected Jesus holding a discourse with his disciples and offering prophecies of the future.

See also
 Apocryphon of James, a similar letter describing secret teachings of Jesus

References

Bibliography 

 
 
 
 
 
 
  (1994), L'Épître des apôtres et le Testament de N.S. Jésus-Christ, Turnhout, Brepols,  « Apocryphes n° 5 », 
 

 Original publications

External links 
 
 (Disclaimer: Somewhat obsolete, more modern translations directly from Coptic / Ethiopic to English have been published since, avoiding the intermediary French / German)

Apostles
Christian anti-Gnosticism
2nd-century Christian texts